Effingham County is the name of two counties in the United States:

Effingham County, Georgia 
Effingham County, Illinois